The 2000 Angola Basketball Super Cup (7th edition) was contested by Primeiro de Agosto, as the 2000 league champion and Petro Atlético, the 2000 cup winner. ASA was the winner, making its 3rd title.

The 2000 Women's Super Cup (5th edition) was contested by Primeiro de Agosto, as the 2000 women's league champion and Desportivo da Nocal, the 2000 cup runner-up. Desportivo da Nocal was the winner.

2000 Men's Super Cup

2000 Women's Super Cup

See also
 2000 Angola Basketball Cup
 2000 BAI Basket

References

Angola Basketball Super Cup seasons
Super Cup